Triangle Lake may refer to:
 Triangle Lake (Idaho), an alpine lake in Elmore County, Idaho
 Triangle Lake, Ontario
 Triangle Lake, Oregon